Oppressed Logic are an American punk band from Oakland, California, United States, who formed in 1994. Currently, the band consists of vocalist Mike Avilez, drummer Jim Redens, guitar and bassist Jake Martinez, and guitarist Mike Fuentes.

The band's first release was a cassette called What They Want... What the Fuck. The first official album the band appeared on was a compilation called Pigs Suck, which was released in 1995 by Clean Plate Records; it featured one Oppressed Logic song called "They're Gonna Die". In late 1995, the band released a split album with Toronto-based punk band Armed and Hammered.  They were signed to Beer City Records in 1995 and released their first 7-inch, P.C. Full of Shit!, in 1996. In 1997, they released their fist full-length LP, Ain't A Damn Thing Changed!. Afterwards, in 1997 and 1998 they completed two 6-week tours across the United States. Soon after the tour, they collaborated on a split 7-inch on Beer City Records, Skinheads Smoke Dope with a Cheap Beer Hangover, with recently re-formed punk rock band Fang.

In December 1998, members Jake Martinez, Ruben Luna, and Chuck Beers left the band. Mike Avilez stayed in the band and, with a new lineup consisting of bassist Adrienne Avilez, guitarist Todd Dammit, and drummer Egore, released the band's second full-length CD, It's Harassment, in 1999 on Industrial Strength Records. Oppressed Logic completed a three-week northwest tour into Canada and a two-week southwest tour though Texas in 2000, followed by a four-week European tour and a tour of California in 2001, accompanied by fellow bands Special Duties and Violent Society, to support the release of It's Harassment.

In 2002, Burnt Ramen Records released a compilation of Oppressed Logic's discography, The Past Ain't Gonna Change, containing all of the band's music from P.C. Full of Shit! to the Fang split, as well as some unreleased studio and live tracks.

During this period, Oppressed Logic went through several new drummers in this period, ending with Gabe Skull from Lowlife, for their third album, Ones That Control, which was eventually released in 2004. Oppressed Logic continued to go through lineup changes, with Mike Avilez remaining the only original and consistent member. In 2004, the band toured with Fang. In 2006, Oppressed Logic played selected shows in Europe and USA during a tour with Retching Red.

In 2008, Oppressed Logic briefly moved to Raleigh, North Carolina, before moving back to Oakland to reform with original and past members Jake Martinez (Blown to Bits, Exit Wound), Chuck Beers (Retox), and Ruben Luna (Exit Wound). Beers and Luna performed in two shows before departing the band once again. Jake has stayed with the band since then. Oppressed Logic has become one of the most prolific Bay Area punk rock bands in terms of the number of concerts they have performed.

Mike Avilez still continues with Oppressed Logic; he also had stints in Last Round Up, Retching Red, Angry Samoans, Strung Up, Hot Plate, Fukm, Guantanamo Dogpile, Zero Bull Shit, Luicidal, Fang, and Battalion of Saints, among others.

Current members
Mike Avilez (vocals) 
Jim Redens (drums)
Jake Martinez (guitar, bass)
Mike Fuentes (guitar)

Past members
Wade Brown (bass)
Chris DeLoria (bass)
Chuck Beers (drums)
Todd Dammit (guitar)
Adrienne Avilez (bass)
Eric Davis (drums)
Gabe Van Dyke (drums)
James Wysynski (guitar)
Adam Grant (drums)
Whore-Hey (guitar) 
Brian Schopflin (bass, guitar)
Foffle (bass) 
Mikey Porter (guitar)
Chumley Porter (bass)

Discography

References

External links
 Oppressed Logic on Myspace
Official site
Oppressed Logic on Burnt Ramen
Beer City Records
Oppressed Logic on Last.fm

Hardcore punk groups from California
Musical groups from Oakland, California
Musical groups established in 1994